Kananga (IPA: [kɐ'naŋga]), officially the Municipality of Kananga, is a 1st class municipality in the province of Leyte, Philippines. According to the 2020 census, it has a population of 59,696 people.

Majority of Kananga's economic activity has historically been concentrated in agriculture. Some are engaged in commerce and trade since the town is geographically close to commercially progressive nearby city, Ormoc City and coastal town of Palompon, Leyte. The town's main crops are coconut (niyog) and rice (palay).

History
Kananga was created in 1950 from the barrios of Lonoy, Kananga, Rizal, Tugbong, Montebello, Aguiting, Agayayan, Montealegre, Libungao, Naghalin, and Masarayao which all used to be part of Ormoc City.

On November 8, 2013, the town and all parts of Leyte was ravagedly hit by deadliest Typhoon Haiyan or Typhoon Yolanda as locally named, destroying town's infrastructure, houses and means of livelihood which are mostly related to agriculture of rice and coconut and small-scale pig farming.
 
Currently, a National Irrigation Administration's project is undertaken connecting rivers from neighboring barangays and town by a cemented dug canal passing through inland villages of as far as Tagaytay to Kawayan that would irrigate several struggling farmers' rice fields.

Geography

Barangays
Kananga is politically subdivided into 23 barangays.

Climate

Demographics

Language
The municipality speaks both Cebuano and Waray, making it a bilingual municipality. The influx of Cebuano speaking settlers from Ormoc and other adjacent municipalities during the olden times is the reason why the Cebuano language flourished in the area.

Economy

Infrastructure

Kananga is a bustling town, located along the highway, in close proximity to Ormoc City in the south. The town also shares a home to Energy Development Corporation's Tongonan Geothermal Powerplant, one of the largest geothermal powerplants in the Philippines.

Several bus companies including Philtranco and DLTBCo operate a bus depot in Manila and in Ormoc City, a few miles from Kananga. There are also quite few small jeepneys, van and buses route from and to Ormoc City and Tacloban City.

Kananga Leyte and neighboring towns and cities in Leyte are served by two commercial airports namely Daniel Z. Romualdez Airport located in Tacloban City, about 52 miles east of the town and local Ormoc Airport in neighboring Ormoc City, which has a connecting Cebu Pacific commercial flights to and from Cebu via Mactan–Cebu International Airport. Kananga can also be reached by sea through Ormoc City's major port where passenger ships and ferries such as Supercat Fast Ferry and OceanJet dock to and from Cebu City and Manila.

Kananga has remained relatively free of the chain stores franchises and strip-mall developments that are common in other towns of similar size, which lends to a distinct township.

Education
Kananga is home to two different secondary schools, Kananga National High School (KNHS) and National Heroes Institute (NHI) as well as Kananga National High School- Kawayan Annex (Grade 7–10 in newly introduced K-12 program education in the Philippines situated on top of the picturesque view of the mountain in Sitio Estrada, where can easily walk through a newly cemented road by about a mile away from the main highway of Barangay Kawayan, which caters neighboring poor students from inland villages of San Isidro and Monteaglegre; and Kananga National High School - Libertad Annex, located in Barangay Libertad, which also caters neighboring students from inland villages. Another public high schools were open in Barangays Rizal and Montebello Annex- the land of Hideco Sugar milling company; the most competitive school among all annexes serving the locale of Barangay montebello, Aguiting, naghalin, masarayao, san ignacio, etc. They are very competitive in terms on sports and contests.

Jose Navarro Polytechnic College has small campus in Naghalin, Kananga, Leyte that awards trade certificates and diplomas to students.

References

External links

 [ Philippine Standard Geographic Code]
Philippine Census Information
Local Governance Performance Management System

Municipalities of Leyte (province)